Ben Williamson may refer to:

 Ben M. Williamson (1864–1941), Democratic U.S. Senator from Kentucky
 Ben Williamson (English footballer) (born 1988), English footballer
 Ben Williamson (Scottish footballer) (born 2001), Scottish footballer
 Ben Williamson Memorial Bridge, a bridge connecting Coal Grove, Ohio to Ashland, Kentucky

See also
 Benjamin Williamson (disambiguation)